Fakiragram  is a railway station on the New Jalpaiguri–New Bongaigaon section of Barauni–Guwahati line and is located in Kokrajhar district in the Indian state of Assam. A branch line from Fakiragram connects to Dhubri.

Trains
Major Trains:
Guwahati - Sir M. Visvesvaraya Terminal Kaziranga Superfast Express
Tambaram-Silghat Town Nagaon Express
Sealdah–Agartala Kanchanjunga Express
Sealdah–Silchar Kanchanjunga Express
Dibrugarh–Howrah Kamrup Express Via Guwahati
Dibrugarh–Howrah Kamrup Express Via Rangapara North
Kamakhya - Delhi Brahmaputra Mail
New Jalpaiguri - Bongaigaon Express
Alipurduar–Silghat Town Rajya Rani Express
Alipurduar–Lumding Intercity Express
Alipurduar–Kamakhya Intercity Express

History
Fakiragram railway station came up with the construction of the Golokganj–Amingaon railway line by Assam-Behar State Railway in the 1900–1910 period. During the period Assam was connected to the rest of India entirely through eastern Bengal.

In pre-independence days, there was a metre-gauge line ––––Teesta–––Fakiragram.

With the partition of India in 1947, the railway link to Assam through East Bengal was broken and Assam got delinked from the rest of India. Fakiragram was connected to the Indian railway system in 1950.

Construction of the -long  broad gauge in the –Jogighopa line, between 1963 and 1965, brought broad-gauge railways to Assam.

Fakiragram–Dhubri line was opened in September 2010 after conversion to broad gauge.

Electrification
Electrification of the Barauni–Katihar–Guwahati line was sanctioned in 2008. In the document on Vision 2020 – A Blue Print for Railway Electrification Programme, in the list of ongoing projects the entire route km (836) is shown as balance work as on 1 April 2010. The entire electrification project is scheduled to be completed by October, 2015.

Amenities
Fakiragram railway station has one double-bedded retiring room.

References 

Railway junction stations in Assam
Railway stations in Kokrajhar district
Alipurduar railway division